The MIL-STD-1168 is a set of standard codes used to identify munitions (ammunition, explosives and propellants).  It was designed to replace the previous confusing Ammunition Identification Code (AIC) system used by the United States Army Ordnance Department.

The purpose of lot numbering ammunition items and creation of ammunition data cards as outlined herein is to provide the identification of homogeneous materiel necessary to ensure accurate control of items during development and experimental stages; during movement of items from production line to production line, from plant to plant, from plant to storage facilities; while at test facility or in the field; for issue to the using services; to enable the proper establishment and maintenance of surveillance records; and to provide a means for properly identifying materiel when withdrawal of defective, deteriorated, hazardous or obsolete ammunition and energetic materiel from service is required. Lot numbering and ammunition data cards also provide documentation and traceability for ammunition lots.

Pre-Standard Lot Code Format [1942-1965]
The format used in the 1940s, 1950's and 1960's was in the format of LLL-NNNN.
In this example, "L" stands for Letter and "N" stands for Number.

The first two or three letters (LL or LLL) were for the Manufacturer's Code. Each manufacturer had a unique code designation.The digits were the Lot's serial number. This was originally 4 or more digits long. Blocks of 4-digit Lot serial numbers were assigned to each manufacturing plant. The date of production of the lots (and the type and grade of ammunition and its packaging) was tracked by biannual supply bulletin rather than marked on the exterior packaging.   

There was confusion at the start from a lack of rigid standards and oversight. Some contractors would use a serial number sequence for each type of ammunition they produced, meaning there would be lots of different ammunition types produced at different times that would have the same lot number. Others grouped ammunition of different types produced at the same time into the same block of lot numbers. This was sorted out by the end of World War Two when more oversight was possible.

Ammunition Crates
Ammunition crates were marked with identifying information. The class of ammunition (e.g., Explosives or Small Arms Ammunition) was embossed on the lid. The front panel had the alphanumeric Ammunition Identification Code (used 1942-1956) in the upper right corner, the gross weight in pounds and volume in cubic feet stamped in the lower left corner, and the Lot Code stamped in the lower right corner. The text in the center of the front panel detailed the amount and type of contents the crate contained.

Ammunition types were indicated by colored stripes on pre-war (1920s to 1930s) and early-war (1940s) crates. The colored stripes were duplicated on the cartons of ammunition inside them. Packing types (cartons, clips in bandoleers, and belted or linked machinegun ammunition) were indicated by pictograms.

Ammunition Packing Codes
The ammunition packing type (clipped, belted, or linked) was designated by manufacturers with an extra code letter. It was either added as a letter code between the Manufacturer's Code and the Interfix Number or as a prefix or suffix to the Lot Sequence Number.
Ammunition in clips (loaded in clips and packed in either cartons or bandoleers) was designated with a "C" (e.g., WRA-01-C1234). This was for rifle ammunition that met standards (Grade 1 or Grade R). It was used in rifles and light machineguns.  
Belted ammunition (loaded into a cloth ammo belt) was designated with a "B" (e.g., LC-01-B1234). This was usually for rifle ammunition that met minimum standards for accuracy (Grade 2 or Grade MG). It was used in medium and heavy machineguns.   
Linked ammunition (loaded into a disintegrating metal link ammo belt) was designated with an "L" (e.g., FA-01-L1234). This was for rifle and heavy machinegun ammunition that met standards (Grade 1 or Grade AC/R) and had a higher standard of reliability. It was used in aircraft and anti-aircraft machineguns.

Foreign Manufacturers
In the 1950s Foreign manufacturers added a letter code prefix to their Lot Sequence Number. When the National Stock Number (NSN) code system replaced the Federal Stock Number (FSN) system, this method was dropped. 
European manufacturers used an E-prefix (e.g., HP-01-E1234 = Hirtenberger Patronenfabriken, Lot 01–1234)
Japanese manufacturers used a J-prefix (e.g., TS-01-J1234 = Toyo Seiki, Lot 01–1234)
Korean manufacturers used a K-prefix (e.g., PS-01-K1234 = Poong-San Metal Corporation, Lot 01–1234)
Nationalist Chinese / Taiwanese manufacturers used a C-prefix (e.g., 58-01-C1234 = Arsenal 58, Lot 01–1234). Taiwanese manufacturers used the Factory or Arsenal number (i.e., Factory 58 used "58") as a Manufacturing Code or cartridge headstamp.

Navy Lot Numbers
The Navy used a different lot numbering system for explosives, propellants, and pyrotechnics (chemical marking and screening devices and rocket motors): NN-LLL-MMYY

The first part (NN) is the serial number, next the Manufacturer's 2 or 3 letter code, followed by a four digit number that indicates the two-digit month and two-digit year it was manufactured. For example, 123-JOP-0554 means it was Lot 123, made by Joliet Ordnance Plant (JOP) in May 1954.

Navy Lot Numbers (1960-1967) 
For most of the 1960s there was a different system used for smoke grenades: NNN/N - Y/M - NNNN (there is no slash in the actual lot number; it is used here to divide the serial number information into sub-groups). For example, the lot number 1023-65-1234.

NNN/N represents the 3-digit manufacturer code and the number of the production line (e.g., 1023 would be Line 3 at Pine Bluff Arsenal (manufacturer 102)).
Y/M indicates the last digit of the two-digit financial year (which runs July to June) and the one-digit financial bi-monthly code (e.g, 65; the "6" would be 1966 and the "5" would be March/April).   
NNNN represents the serial number (e.g., 1234) of the lot.

Navy Manufacturer Codes (1960-1967)
102 Pine Bluff Arsenal (PBA) - Pine Bluff, AR. 
103 Rocky Mountain Arsenal (RMA) - Commerce City, CO.
201 Ordnance Products Inc. (OPI) - Gardena, CA.
202 Unidynamics (UNI) - Dallas, TX.
203 Northrup Carolina Inc. (NCI) - Asheville, NC.
204 Unidynamics / Phoenix (UNV) - Phoenix, AZ.

MIL-STD-1168 (Ammunition Lot Numbering) [Published 30 June 1965; 1965-1975]
The "Old Standard". This system used two designation codes.

The Federal Stock Number (FSN) was an 11-digit code number (NNNN-NNN-NNNN) indicating the contents and composition of the package. (In this example, "N" stands for Number.)The first four digits comprise the Federal Stock Composition Group, the Type and Family the item belongs to.   
Small Arms Ammunition (weapons with a bore up to 30mm) are given the FSCG prefix of 1305. 
Heavy Weapons Ammunition (weapons with a bore greater than 30mm) are given the FSCG prefixes of 1310 (30mm through 75mm), 1315 (75mm through 125mm), or 1320 (greater than 125mm).
The 7-digit number that follows (NNN-NNNN) is composed of the unique 3-digit interfix number and 4-digit sequence number identifying a stock item.

Department of Defense Identification Code
The Department of Defense Identification Code (DODIC) is a 4-symbol alphanumeric code designation for a type of item. It starts with 1 or 2 code letters and the remainder is a 2- or 3-digit code number. It indicates an item of supply (e.g., 5.56mm NATO M193 Ball) and its packing sub-unit (e.g., 20-round carton, 10-round clip, or 200-round linked belt). It is used to inform the person ordering or issuing the item what it is and how it is packed so they get what they need.   

The Department of Defense Ammunition Code (DODAC or DDAC) is an 8-symbol (7 digits and a letter) hybrid code designation. It uses the munition's four-digit Federal Supply Classification Group (the first four digits of the item's FSN) followed by its alphanumeric DODIC. It is used mostly when filling out ammunition record sheets. This is done to prevent errors and confusion during ammunition transactions.

Standard Lot Code (1965-1975)
The lot numbers were beginning to get very long and the lot assigning system was becoming complicated. The reform was to reset the lot numbering system and have each plant start from zero. The Lot number is in the format of: LLL-NN-NNNN.In this example, "L" stands for Letter and "N" stands for Number.

The first two or three letters (LL or LLL) were for the Manufacturer's Code. Each manufacturer had a code designation.

The next two digits were the “Interfix Number”. This indicates the batch the lot was part of, allowing the Lot Sequence Number to be reused later. It is numbered from 01 to 99.

The last digits were the serial number, called the Lot Sequence Number. This could be 4 or more digits long.

For example, let's say the fictional manufacturer Amalgamated Bio-Carbon (code ABC) makes a shipment of 40 x 46mm low-velocity grenade shells. The lot is Interfix Number #12 and the Sequence Number #345. The Lot Code would then be ABC-12-0345.

Ammunition Crates
Ammunition crates were marked with the FSN and DODIC along the top of the front panel. Early crates from 1942 to 1956 also included the alphanumeric Ammunition Identification Code in the upper right corner. The weight in pounds and volume in cubic feet were stamped in the lower left corner. The Lot Code was stamped in the lower right corner. The text in the center of the front panel detailed the amount and type of contents the crate contained.

Ammunition Boxes
Each ammunition box was marked with the FSN and DODIC along the upper part of the box. It also was embossed with the ammunition designation and type (i.e., 5.56mm NATO M193 BALL), and there were symbols indicating packing method (linked, clips or cartons; bandoleers or containers).

MIL-STD-1168A (Ammunition Lot Numbering - Revision A) [Published 28 February 1975; 1975-1998]
The "New Standard".

The FSN was replaced on September 30, 1974, by the National Stock Number, a 13-digit code number (NNNN-NN-NNN-NNNN).The first 4 digits comprise the National Stock Composition Group (NSCG), which indicates the group and class of materials it belongs to.The next 2 digits are the National Codification Bureau code, the code number for the NATO member nation stocking and producing the item. (For example, the United States uses the NCB codes 00 and 01 and Canada was assigned 20 and 21; the first number was for pre-1975 production and the second for 1975 and later production.)The 7-digit code number that follows is the unique 3-digit interfix number and 4-digit sequence number of the item.

Lot Number
The Lot number is in the format of: LL - NN - L - NN - NNNL.In this example, "L" stands for Letter and "N" stands for Number.

The first section (LL or LLL) is the manufacturer's code, which is two or three letters long.

The second section (NNL) is the date code. This consists of the last two digits of the year of manufacture and a letter suffix indicating the month of production:

The letter "I" is omitted because it might be mistaken for the numeral "1" or the letter "J". The letter "O" is omitted because it might be mistaken for the numeral "0".

Following the date code is the third section: the Interfix Number (NN), which can be 3 or more digits long. This indicates the batch of material the item belongs to.

The last section is the Lot Sequence Number (NNN-L), which is 4 or more digits long. This is the sequential serial number of the lot.

A single-letter alphabetic suffix may be added to the parent Lot Sequence Number for various reasons. The item may have been made on a different machine or production line than the rest of the batch or a portion of the batch was found defective by quality control. The letters "I" and "O" are omitted because they could be mistaken for the numbers "1" and "0". The letters "E" and "X" were omitted because they could be mistaken for the letter codes for Experimental ammunition lots.

As an example of a lot number would be: FA-77-A-123-0456A. This would mean that contractor Frankfort Arsenal made the item in January, 1977 and that it was rework "A" (i.e. the second portion) of the 456th Item of the 123rd batch. If a second rework (rework "B", or the third portion of the lot) had been performed on the Item, the code would have been FA-77-A-123-0456B (and so on).

Explosives Lot Numbers
Explosives, propellants, and pyrotechnics (chemical marking and screening devices and rocket motors) use a different lot numbering system: LL/NNNN/MMM/YY (there are no dashes in the actual lot number; they are there to break the lot number into identifiable sub-groups).

LL/NNNN was the Lot number; the letters (LL) are the Lot Interfix and the numbers (NNNN) are the Lot Sequence. The next block of letters are the three-letter Manufacturer's Code (MMM), followed by the two-digit year of production (YY). For example, AB1234HAW76 would be Lot AB1234, made or repacked by Naval Ammunition Depot Hawthorne (HAW) in 1976 (76).

MIL-STD-1168B (Ammunition Lot Numbering and Ammunition Data Cards - Revision B) [Published 10 June 1998; 1998-2014]
This merged the standards for MIL-STD-1167 (Ammunition Data Cards) and MIL-STD-1168 (Ammunition Lot Numbering) into one standard for both systems. Unlike previous iterations that used dashes between the sections, the new system only puts a dash between the Interfix and Lot Sequence numbers. Lot codes are between 13 and 14 symbols long and are in the format of: LLL/NN/L/NNN-NNN.

In this system, the 3-digit Interfix Number would be the key to the Lot Code. It would be used for the same or similar products manufactured at the same time on the same production lines at the same facility. The Interfix Number would be differenced by the 3-digit Lot Sequence numbers set aside for each item.

The system still uses the same 2- or 3-letter Manufacturing Code, 2-digit Year of Production, and alphabetic Month of Production codes. Even if the year or month changes, the Interfix code will still remain the same until its combinations are all used up.

For example, Amalgamated Bio-Carbon (ABC) makes the M1 (Point-Detonating), M2 (Air-Burst), and M3 (Rebounding) fuzes for the 40mm Low Velocity grenade shell. They all have the 123 Lot Interfix number but the Lot Sequence numbers are assigned in alternating blocks. The M1 Grenade shells get Lot Sequence Numbers -001, -004, and -007; the M2 shells get Lot Sequence Numbers -002, -005, and -008; and the M3 shells get Lot Sequence Numbers -003, -006, and -009. The M1 batches would be Lot Coded as ABC99L123-001 (made in November, 1999), ABC99M123-004 (made in December, 1999), and ABC00A123-007 (made in January, 2000). When those items were completed new Lot Sequence numbers in the Interfix series would be assigned.

New Interfix numbers would usually be issued when all combinations of a Lot Interfix's Lot Sequence numbers (001-999) had been used up. They would also be issued for a variety of other reasons: 
If a production line was stopped to be overhauled or updated and an alternate, different, or new production line was used instead.  
If a previous lot was found to be defective or sub-standard and the line was stopped until quality control measures were used to correct the problem. 
If a variant design or improvement was incorporated in the item.
If an item was declared obsolete or limited standard and further production is to cease.

MIL-STD-1168C (Ammunition Lot Numbering and Ammunition Data Card - Revision C) [Published 11 March 2014; 2014-present]

The Lot Number is now between 13 and 16 symbols long. There are no spaces between symbols in the Lot Number.

The Ammunition Lot Identifier letter is used for non-standard lots of ammunition.  

The Ammunition Lot Suffix letter is now potentially up to two letters (from letters A to Z, then AA through ZZ).

The Ammunition Lot Theater Indicator is an optional code letter indicating the ammunition is destined for an active Theater of Operations. It makes it easier to track ammunition that has been returned to stores from a combat zone. It can also be used to earmark ammunition that may need to be checked and salvaged due to potential poor handling and/or storage. 
Y - Desert Shield / Desert Storm 
W - Iraq / Afghanistan. Used for missile systems sent into the Southwest Asian Theater, like Javelin; Stinger; Hellfire; Tube-launched, Optically-tracked, Wire-guided missile (TOW); Guided Missile Large Rocket System (GMLRS); Army Tactical Missile System (ATACMS), and High Mobility Artillery Rocket System (HIMARS).
T - Desert Storm / Iraq & Afghanistan.

Lot Number
The Lot number is in the format of: LLH/NNL/NNNH/NNNLL/L. In this example, "L" stands for Letter, "N" stands for Number, and "H" stands for Hyphen. The slashes are to break the Lot Number code into identifiable sections.

The first section (LLH or LLL) is the three-symbol Manufacturer’s Identification Symbol, which is two or three letters long. If it is only two letters long, a Hyphen is added at the end to balance it out.

The second section (NNL) is the date code. It is composed of the last two digits of the year of manufacture and a letter suffix (A through M) indicating the month of production.

The third section (NNNH) is the Lot Interfix Number, which is a three digit number. This usually followed by a Hyphen in a standard lot, but could be followed by an Ammunition Lot Identifier code if it is non-standard.

The fourth section (NNNLL) is the Lot Sequence Number, which has three or more numbers. It could be followed by one or two Ammunition Lot Suffix code letters if there were any stoppages or changes in production for any reason, but is omitted in an homogeneous lot.

The fifth section (L) is the Ammunition Lot Theater Indicator.

Examples

(There is currently no Theater Indicator code letter "Z"; it is being used just as an example). N/A means "Not Applicable"; this designation is not in use in this lot number.

Manufacturer's Identification Symbols

US Manufacturers
AAJ AAI Corporation (a division of Textron Systems) -  Hunt Valley, Maryland.
AJM  Action Manufacturing Company - Bristol, Pennsylvania, USA
AKT Action Manufacturing Company - Philadelphia, Pennsylvania, USA
AMC Neff Plastics - Bloomfield, Iowa, USA.
AMJ AMTEC Corporation - Janesville, Wisconsin, USA
AMN Action Manufacturing Company - Atglen, Pennsylvania, USA
BRW Borg Warner Manufacturing - Chicago, Illinois USA: Made cartridge cases, stripper clips and disintegrating machinegun ammo belt links. 
FA Frankford Arsenal - Philadelphia 
FCC Federal Cartridge Company - Anoka, Minnesota, USA.
HAW Naval Ammunition Depot Hawthorne (NADH) [1930-1976] - Hawthorne, Nevada, USA: Transferred to the US Army in 1977 to become the Hawthorne Army Ammunition Plant.
HW Hawthorne Army Ammunition Plant (HWAAP) [1977-1995] / Hawthorne Army Depot (HWAD) [1996–Present] - Hawthorne.
LC Lake City Army Ammunition Plant - Independence, Missouri, USA: a sub-contractor owned by Alliant Techsystems (ATK).
LOP Louisiana Army Ammunition Plant (1942–1996) - Doyline, Webster Parish, Louisiana, USA.
LS Lone Star Army Ammunition Plant (1941-2009) - Texarkana, Texas, USA. 
MA Milan Arsenal - Milan, Tennessee, USA. 
PB, PBA Pine Bluff Arsenal - Pine Bluff, Arkansas, USA. 
RA Remington Arms
RIA Rock Island Arsenal - Arsenal Island, Illinois, USA. 
RMA Rocky Mountain Arsenal - Commerce City, Colorado, USA.
RSB Rowley Spring & Stamping - Bristol, Connecticut, USA.
SL St. Louis Army Ammunition Plant - St. Louis, Missouri, USA. 
TRW Thompson-Ramo-Wooldridge. -  Euclid, Ohio, USA.
TW Twin Cities Army Ammunition Plant - Ramsey County, Minnesota, USA: A sub-contractor owned by Federal Cartridge.
UPH Unidynamics (?-2006) - Phoenix, Arizona.
WRA Winchester Repeating Arms - a subdivision of the Western Cartridge Company.
WCC Western Cartridge Company -  East Alton, Illinois, USA.

FN America LLC. - Columbia, South Carolina.
OTS Inc. (a division of General Dynamics) - Dallas, Texas
PCP Tactical, LLC. - Vero Beach, Florida.
Sig Sauer Inc. - Newington, New Hampshire.

Foreign Manufacturers
DAQ Dominion Arsenal - Quebec City -  Quebec City, Quebec (region), Quebec (province); Canada
FN Fabrique Nationale d'Herstal ("National Factory at Herstal") - Herstal, Belgium. 
HXP Greek Powder & Cartridge Company (Pyrkal) (1908-2004) - Athens, Greece. 
IVI Industries Valcartier Incorporee (1935-1967; 1967–1991) - Valcartier,  Quebec (region), Quebec (province), Canada. Founded in 1935, privatized in 1967, closed down in 1991.
FKP Poongsan Metal Manufacturing Co. Ltd. - Seoul, Republic of Korea.
KA Pusan Government Arsenal - Busan Metropolitan City, Republic of Korea.
TZZ Israeli Military Industries Small Caliber Ammunition Division (1982–Present) - Tel Aviv, Israel.
VA Verdun Arsenal - Verdun, Montreal, Quebec, Canada. During World War Two it manufactured ammunition for the Canadian armed forces, as well as Britain, the United States, and the Republic of China.

References

Military of the United States standards